Marsela Yuliana Awi (born 10 May 2003) is an Indonesian footballer who plays a forward for Asprov Papua and the Indonesia women's national team.

Club career
Yuliana has played for Asprov Papua in Indonesia.

International career 
Yuliana represented Indonesia at the 2022 AFC Women's Asian Cup.

International goals

Honours

Club
Toli FC
 Pertiwi Cup: 2021–22

References

External links

2003 births
Living people
People from Manokwari
Indonesian women's footballers
Women's association football forwards
Indonesia women's international footballers